El Real de Santa María  is a corregimiento in Pinogana District, Darién Province, Panama with a population of 1,183 as of 2010. It is the seat of Pinogana District. Its population as of 1990 was 1,201; its population as of 2000 was 1,185.

The town of El Real is on the Pirre River, a small tributary of the Tuira River.

The town was founded by the Spanish as a fort in 1665 to protect their gold mining interests in the area.The history of mining and mineral exploration in Panama: From Pre-Columbian gold mining to modern copper mining,  Boletín de la Sociedad Geológica Mexicana, vol. 72, no. 3, 00012, 2020 (" The deposits were first worked by the Spaniards in about 1665 when the fort and mining town of El Real de Santa Maria was founded on the Río Tuira") The English Buccaneer Bartholomew Sharp took over the town and fort in 1680, but found the Spanish had removed most of the gold they hoped to seize, and left after a few days.

El Real Airport is an airstrip serving the area.

References

Corregimientos of Darién Province
Populated places in Darién Province
Populated places established in 1665